Franz Offenberger (27 November 1931 – 17 December 2003) was an Austrian speed skater. He competed at the 1952 Winter Olympics, the 1956 Winter Olympics and the 1960 Winter Olympics.

References

1931 births
2003 deaths
Austrian male speed skaters
Olympic speed skaters of Austria
Speed skaters at the 1952 Winter Olympics
Speed skaters at the 1956 Winter Olympics
Speed skaters at the 1960 Winter Olympics
Sportspeople from Vienna